The 2019–20 season was Kayserispor's 54th year in existence. In addition to the domestic league, Kayserispor participated in the Turkish Cup.

Squad 

 (captain)

 (vice-captain)
 (U-19)

 (U-19)
 (U-19)
 (U-19)

 (U-19)

 (U-19)

 (U-19)

 (U-19)
 (U-19)

 (U-19)

 (U-19)
 (U-19)

 (U-19)
 (U-19)
 (U-19)

 (U-19)

 (U-19)

 (U-19)

 (U-19)
 (U-19)
 (U-19)
 (U-19)
 (U-19)

(U-19)= eligible to play for Kayserispor under-19

Süper Lig

League table

Results summary

Results by round

Matches

References
 

Kayserispor seasons
Turkish football clubs 2019–20 season